Danilo culture was a Neolithic culture of the Dalmatian coast of Croatia and parts of Bosnia, dating to 4700-3900 BC.

The dig site consists of large numbers of pits and post holes whose associated material has been subdivided typologically into five phases.

There are two associated pottery styles, painted in black and broad red bands on buff ware, and incised on dark burnished ware, belong in the Middle Neolithic. The geometric designs suggest connections with contemporary wares in Italy, particularly Ripoli and Serra D'Alto. There was also a long blade and tanged point stone industry closely related to fishing.

Gallery

See also
 Impressed Ware
 Kakanj culture

Sources
 

Neolithic cultures of Europe
Archaeological cultures of Southeastern Europe
Archaeological cultures in Bosnia and Herzegovina
Archaeological cultures in Croatia
History of Dalmatia